Chloroclystis apotoma is a moth in the family Geometridae. It is found on Sulawesi.

References

Moths described in 1958
Chloroclystis
Moths of Indonesia